This is a list of the officers of the Royal Academy of Arts.

Presidents (PRA)

Keepers

Other posts

References

External links
Full list of Academicians RAs, Senior RAs, Honorary RAs, Honorary Fellows and Honorary Members

Royal Academy